Julie Harrington (born February 5, 1962) is a former professional tennis player from the United States.

Tennis career
Harrington was a left-handed player, who grew up in Spokane, Washington. She attended the local Joel E. Ferris High School and turned professional at the age of 16. As a qualifier at the 1979 US Open she beat 14th seed Pam Shriver, then overcame Peanut Louie Harper in the second round, before losing in three sets to Jeanne DuVall. She made the third round of grand slam tournaments on two further occasions, both in 1981, at the French and US Open. A two-time WTA Tour finalist, she was runner-up in the singles at Kyoto in 1981 and at the 1983 Bakersfield Open.

WTA Tour finals

Singles (0-2)

References

External links
 
 

1962 births
Living people
American female tennis players
Sportspeople from Spokane, Washington
Tennis people from Washington (state)
21st-century American women